The BYD G3 is a compact car by BYD. It is essentially an enlarged version of the BYD's compact car BYD F3, first introduced in October 2009.

Overview
The BYD G3 aims for sales in China's "Tier 1" cities (Shanghai, Beijing, Guangzhou), hoping to target more sophisticated buyers than those who choose the F3. Production ended in 2014.

In China there is a very narrowly framed automotive hierarchy, leading to a habit of many manufacturers to offer stretched wheelbase version of much smaller cars than one would commonly find in the rest of the world. For instance, there is a China-only Audi A4L, and even the subcompact Tianjin Xiali has been available in a long-wheelbase version. The compact G3 continues this practice.

Also unique to the G3 is the availability of a larger 1.8 litre inline-four engine.

Equipment is also higher than for the corresponding F3; the G3 offers sat-nav, LED taillights, leather seats, and a remotely controlled central-locking system.

The G3 sold about 12,000 units in the first six months of 2010, which was less than one tenth as many as the combined results of the smaller F3 and F3-R.

References

External links 

 Official Website

G3
Cars introduced in 2009
Sedans
Compact cars
2010s cars